Ravine River may refer to:

 Ravine River (Haiti)
 Ravine River (Michigan)